This is a list of the National Register of Historic Places listings in Everglades National Park.

This is intended to be a complete list of the properties and districts on the National Register of Historic Places in Everglades National Park, Florida, United States.  The locations of National Register properties and districts for which the latitude and longitude coordinates are included below, may be seen in a Google map.

There are eleven properties and districts listed on the National Register in the park, one of which is a National Historic Landmark.

Current listings 

|--
|}

See also 
 National Register of Historic Places listings in Collier County, Florida
 National Register of Historic Places listings in Miami-Dade County, Florida
 National Register of Historic Places listings in Monroe County, Florida
 List of National Historic Landmarks in Florida
 National Register of Historic Places listings in Florida
 Archeological Resources of Everglades National Park MPS

References 
Schwadron, Margo. National Register of Historic Places Multiple Property Documentation Form: Archeological Resources of Everglades National Park. National Park Service April 1996 

Everglades National Park